Fulakora is a genus of ants in the subfamily Amblyoponinae. The genus has a worldwide distribution, and like most other amblyoponines, Fulakora species are specialized predators. It was originally described as, and for a long time considered to be, a subgenus of Stigmatomma until it was elevated to an independent genus by Ward & Fisher (2016).

Species
Fulakora agostii (Lacau & Delabie, 2002)
Fulakora armigera (Mayr, 1887)
Fulakora bierigi (Santschi, 1930)
Fulakora celata (Mann, 1919)
Fulakora chilensis (Mayr, 1887)
Fulakora cleae (Lacau & Delabie, 2002)
Fulakora degenerata (Borgmeier, 1957)
Fulakora egregia (Kusnezov, 1955)
Fulakora elongata (Santschi, 1912)
Fulakora exigua (Clark, 1928)
Fulakora falcata (Lattke, 1991)
Fulakora gnoma (Taylor, 1979)
Fulakora gracilis (Clark, 1934)
Fulakora heraldoi (Lacau & Delabie, 2002)
Fulakora lucida (Clark, 1934)
Fulakora lurilabes (Lattke, 1991)
Fulakora minima (Kusnezov, 1955)
Fulakora monrosi (Brown, 1960)
Fulakora mystriops (Brown, 1960)
Fulakora orizabana (Brown, 1960)
Fulakora papuana (Taylor, 1979)
Fulakora punctulata (Clark, 1934)
Fulakora saundersi (Forel, 1892)
Fulakora smithi (Brown, 1960)
Fulakora wilsoni (Clark, 1928)

References

External links

Amblyoponinae
Ant genera